Minke Gertine Booij (born 24 January 1977 in Zaanstad) is a Dutch field hockey player, who played more than 150 international matches for the Netherlands national team since her debut, on 9 September 1998 in a friendly match against Japan.

References
 Dutch Hockey Federation

External links
 

1977 births
Living people
Dutch female field hockey players
Olympic field hockey players of the Netherlands
Olympic gold medalists for the Netherlands
Olympic silver medalists for the Netherlands
Olympic bronze medalists for the Netherlands
Field hockey players at the 2000 Summer Olympics
Field hockey players at the 2004 Summer Olympics
Field hockey players at the 2008 Summer Olympics
Sportspeople from Zaanstad
Olympic medalists in field hockey
Medalists at the 2000 Summer Olympics
Medalists at the 2004 Summer Olympics
Medalists at the 2008 Summer Olympics
HC Den Bosch players
20th-century Dutch women
21st-century Dutch women